Jamie Arentzen (born November 22, 1970) is a member of the alternative rock band American Hi-Fi and lead guitarist for Miley Cyrus. In the spring of 2009, he also played with Butch Walker's band, Butch Walker and the Let's Go Out Tonites.

Life and career 
Arentzen was born in Guilford, Connecticut, where he attended Guilford High School. Thereafter, he studied music and liberal arts at the University of Miami, the University of Connecticut and Berklee College of Music in Boston, Massachusetts. Settling in Boston, Arentzen played in various bands, including the indie band Sky Heroes. While living in Boston, he formed American Hi-Fi with friends Stacy Jones, Brian Nolan, and Drew Parsons.

Arentzen currently resides in Los Angeles, CA.

Equipment 
Guitars: 1970 Les Paul Deluxe Goldtop, Fender Jazzmaster, Gibson Flying V, 1963 Gibson SG Junior
Strings: Ernie Ball

External links 
 "The Climb" live on The Today Show
 "See You Again" live on The Today Show
 "7 Things" Official Music Video
 "Start All Over" Official Music Video
 "These Four Walls" live acoustic on Q100
 "Butterfly Fly Away" Sessions@AOL
 American Hi-Fi at YouTube
Americanhi-fi.com/ Official band website
r
American Hi-Fi at Rolling Stone
Jamie Arentzen on IMDB

1970 births
American alternative rock musicians
American rock guitarists
American male guitarists
Living people
Guitarists from Connecticut
Alternative rock guitarists
Miley Cyrus Band members
American Hi-Fi members